The European Men's Artistic Gymnastics Championships are an annual series of artistic gymnastics championships for male gymnasts from European countries organised by the European Union of Gymnastics.

History 

Originally held biannually and in odd-numbered years, the championships moved to even-numbered years in 1990. In 2005 a second set of championships was introduced, titled the "individual championships". Although numbered as a separate event, winners in either event are considered European champions, and the championships as a result have in effect become an annual event, but in two formats; in even-numbered years, a stand-alone men's event incorporates the European Junior Artistic Gymnastics championships (an entirely separate women's competition is held in the same years), while in odd-numbered years, the separately numbered 'individual championships' are held in conjunction with the women's competition of the same description, but without juniors, as a single event.

As a result, there is no individual all-around title awarded in even-numbered years (except for juniors), and similarly no team all-around title awarded in odd-numbered years. These thus remain biannual events. Otherwise the apparatus and titles are identical.

In 2015, UEG agreed that beginning in 2018, the annual European Championships in the midyear of the Olympic cycle (i.e. 2 years after, and before, a Summer Olympic Games) would be held as part of the new multi-sport European Championships event, and would be held in that format every four years. These combined events will continue to be run by UEG and the other sports federations. Although both the Men's and Women's championships will be held together, in the same venue, these championships will continue to be treated as separate men's and women's events, with junior events included.

A further event, the European Games also holds a full set of championships for European artistic gymnasts in the year preceding the Summer Olympic Games, having begun in 2015. These, however, are organized by the European Olympic Committees and are not recognized as part of the continuity of the European Championships.

Championships 

Before 1996, European men's championships were held separately for both Seniors and Juniors. Beginning in 1996, Senior and Junior men's championships were combined. In 2005 a new and combined European Men's and Women's Artistic Gymnastics Individual Championships were inaugurated for senior gymnasts only. Although these championships are numbered separately, and the medals awarded counted separately, they constitute European Championships in the same manner as the men- and women-only competitions they alternate with, and the winners are considered European champions in the same way. For that reason, a list of those championships is also included in the section below.

The 2018 and 2022 editions of the Men's Championships formed part of the multi-sport European Championships of those years.

Senior and Junior Men's Championships (held separately)

Medal table

Seniors 
As of 2022.

Juniors

See also
 European Artistic Gymnastics Championships – Men's individual all-around
 European Men's and Women's Artistic Gymnastics Individual Championships
 European Women's Artistic Gymnastics Championships
 World Artistic Gymnastics Championships

Notes

Results

References

 
Recurring sporting events established in 1955
Men's sports competitions in Europe